Rehau is a town in the district of Hof, in Bavaria, Germany. The first documented name of Rehau was "Resawe" in the year 1234. Rehau is situated in the Fichtelgebirge, 12 km southeast of Hof, and 12 km west of Aš. Formerly a fairly isolated town, located as it is near both Czech and former East German borders, with the fall of The Wall, it is now in the centre of a growing area, with a new Autobahn providing ready access from Nuremberg and Munich.

The principal employer and economic engine is the polymer manufacturer Rehau AG & Co, which was founded in 1948. With more than 15,000 employees Rehau is an international company that produces products for the construction industry, automotive and general industry.

Sons and daughters of the city 

 Peter Angermann (born 1945), painter
 Eberhard Bodenschatz (born 1959), physicist
 Karl-Heinrich Bodenschatz, (1890-1979), in the First World War adjutant of Manfred von Richthofen, later General of the Luftwaffe and adjutant of Hermann Göring  
 Arthur Grimm (1908-after 1990), photographer
 Hans Grimm (1905-1998), director
 Hans Vogt (engineer) (1890-1979), engineer
 Jobst Wagner (born 1959), head of Rehau Group

Personalities who have worked on the ground 

 Eugen Gomringer, (born 1925), artist
 Nora-Eugenie Gomringer, (born 1980), artist

References

External links
 Website of Rehau

Hof (district)